Season three of the television program American Experience originally aired on the PBS network in the United States on October 1, 1990 and concluded on February 4, 1991. This is the third season to feature David McCullough as the host. The season contained 12 new episodes and began with the film Lindbergh.

Episodes

 Denotes multiple chapters that aired on the same date and share the same episode number

References

1990 American television seasons
1991 American television seasons
American Experience